Paul Ferdonnet (28 April 1901 – 4 August 1945), dubbed "the Stuttgart traitor" by the French press, was a French journalist and Nazi sympathizer, who was executed for treason in 1945.

Biography
A Nazi sympathizer, Ferdonnet was known for having published an anti-semitic book, La Guerre juive (The Jewish War). He relocated to Germany in the 1930s and was an employee of Radio-Stuttgart where he worked on propaganda broadcast in French and aimed at promoting the Nazi regime and demoralizing French troops and civilians. Ferdonnet was identified in 1939 by French intelligence as the main French speaker of Radio-Stuttgart. The previously obscure Ferdonnet became famous and notorious, and claimed that Britain would let France fight and die on its behalf: "Britain provides the machines, France provides the bodies".

After the fall of France, transmissions in French were progressively discontinued and Ferdonnet stopped working for Radio-Stuttgart around 1942. He was arrested after the fall of Nazi Germany and executed for treason in 1945. During his trial, Ferdonnet asserted in vain that he had not been the speaker. Some historians consider that he might have merely worked for Radio-Stuttgart as a translator of the scripts submitted by the Germans, his translations being read by another Frenchman. According to writer Maurice-Yvan Sicard (writing under the pseudonym Saint-Paulien and himself a former collaborationist), the actual speaker was "a former actor named Obrecht", an actor who was never found. This evidence is considered by experts on the subject as void.

References

1901 births
1945 deaths
French radio presenters
Nazi propagandists
Nazi propaganda radio
Nazi collaborators shot at the Fort de Montrouge
Executed French people
French male non-fiction writers
20th-century French male writers